The Rock of Cashel, also known as Cashel of the Kings and St. Patrick's Rock, is a historic site located at Cashel, County Tipperary, Ireland.

History

According to local legends, the Rock of Cashel originated in the Devil's Bit, a mountain 20 miles (30 km) north of Cashel when St. Patrick banished Satan from a cave, resulting in the Rock's landing in Cashel. Cashel is reputed to be the site of the conversion of the King of Munster by Saint Patrick in the 5th century.

The Rock of Cashel was the traditional seat of the kings of Munster for several hundred years prior to the Norman invasion. In 1101, the King of Munster, Muirchertach Ua Briain, donated his fortress on the Rock to the Church.
The picturesque complex has a character of its own and is one of the most remarkable collections of Celtic art and medieval architecture to be found anywhere in Europe. Few remnants of the early structures survive; the majority of buildings on the current site date from the 12th and 13th centuries.

Buildings on the Rock

The tower was built using the dry stone method. Modern conservationists have filled in some of the tower with mortar for safety reasons.  

Cormac's Chapel, the chapel of King Cormac Mac Carthaigh, was begun in 1127 and consecrated in 1134. It is a sophisticated structure, with vaulted ceilings and wide arches, drawing on contemporary European architecture and infusing unique native elements.  The Irish Abbot of Regensburg, Dirmicius of Regensburg, sent two of his carpenters to help in the work and the twin towers on either side of the junction of the nave and chancel are strongly suggestive of their Germanic influence, as this feature is otherwise unknown in Ireland.  Other notable features of the building include interior and exterior arcading, a barrel-vaulted roof, a carved tympanum over both doorways, the magnificent north doorway and chancel arch and the oldest stairs in Ireland. It contains one of the best-preserved Irish frescoes from this time period. The chapel was constructed primarily of sandstone which has become waterlogged over the centuries, significantly damaging the interior frescoes.  Restoration and preservation required the chapel be completely enclosed in a rain-proof structure with interior dehumidifiers to dry out the stone. It is now open for limited tours to the public.

The Cathedral, built between 1235 and 1270, is an aisleless building of cruciform plan, having a central tower and terminating westwards in a massive residential castle. The Hall of the Vicars Choral was built in the 15th century. The vicars choral were laymen (sometimes minor canons) appointed to assist in chanting the cathedral services. At Cashel, there were originally eight vicars choral with their own seal. This was later reduced to five honorary vicars choral who appointed singing-men as their deputies, a practice which continued until 1836. The restoration of the Hall was undertaken by the Office of Public Works as a project in connection with the European Architectural Heritage Year, 1975. Through it visitors now enter the site.

In 1647, during the Irish Confederate Wars, Cashel was sacked by English Parliamentarian troops under Murrough O'Brien, 1st Earl of Inchiquin. The Irish Confederate troops there were massacred, as were the Catholic clergy, including Theobald Stapleton. Inchiquin's troops looted or destroyed many important religious artefacts.

In 1629, the main cathedral roof was destroyed by Arthur Price, the Anglican Archbishop of Cashel. Today, what remains of the Rock of Cashel has become a tourist attraction. Price's decision to remove the roof on what had been called the jewel among Irish church buildings was criticised before and since.

Queen Elizabeth II visited the Rock of Cashel during her 11th visit to Ireland.

Other features

The entire plateau on which the buildings and graveyard lie is walled. In the grounds around the buildings an extensive graveyard includes a number of high crosses. Scully's Cross, one of the largest and most famous high crosses here, originally constructed in 1860 to commemorate the Scully family, was destroyed in 1976 when lightning struck a metal rod that ran the length of the cross. The remains of the top of the cross now lie at the base of the cross adjacent to the rock wall.

Burials
Malcolm Hamilton (archbishop)

See also
 Eóganachta
 Hore Abbey
 Kings of Desmond
 Synod of Cashel
 National monuments of Ireland

References

External links
 
 Rock of Cashel on Heritage Ireland site

Cashel, County Tipperary
Cashel
Religion in County Tipperary
Towers in the Republic of Ireland
National Monuments in County Tipperary
Royal sites of Ireland
MacCarthy dynasty
Celtic art
Medieval architecture
Mountain monuments and memorials
Castles in County Tipperary
Historic house museums in the Republic of Ireland
Museums in County Tipperary
Romanesque architecture in Ireland
Cashel
Tourist attractions in County Tipperary
History of County Tipperary
Pre-Reformation Roman Catholic cathedrals
Former churches in the Republic of Ireland